Mummy Ridge is a ridge 1 nautical mile (1.9 km) east of Pyramid Peak in the Destination Nunataks, north Victoria Land. The ridge was visited in 1981-82 by Bradley Field, geologist, New Zealand Geological Survey, who suggested the name in association with nearby Pyramid Peak and Sphinx Peak.

References

Ridges of Victoria Land
McMurdo Dry Valleys